Steve Marohl was an All-American lacrosse player at UMBC from 1988 to 1992.

Career

Marohl is among the all-time Division I leaders in single-season scoring with 37 goal and 77 assists for 114 points in 15 games. He is also the all-time career leading scorer at UMBC with 105 goals and 137 assists for 242 points. He was selected third team All American in 1992. Marohl's 12 assists against University of Pennsylvania remains the single game record.  In his final two seasons at UMBC, the Retrievers had 10-5 records each year, including wins against Maryland, Notre Dame, Penn and Ohio State. UMBC was coached then by National lacrosse Hall of Fame former Johns Hopkins player, Dick Watts.

Marohl played professionally for the National Lacrosse League's Baltimore Thunder in 1993 and Pittsburgh CrosseFire in 2000. Marohl was also on the Major League Lacrosse Baltimore Bayhawks roster in 2004 and 2006 where he tallied 20 goals and 14 assists in 18 games. His brother, Dan Marohl, was an all-star playing for the NLL Minnesota Swarm.

Steve is a member of the UMBC Hall of Fame and has worked as an analyst for the UMBC flagship station WNST (AM-1570). Marohl was also a commenter and host of a financial talk show on WNAV in Annapolis.

Marohl is originally from Edgewater, MD and attended South River High School. In 2012, Marohl was an assistant coach for the undefeated state title South River Seahawks (Anne Arundel County).

Statistics

UMBC

(a) 2nd in NCAA single season assists
(b) 8th in NCAA single season points
(c) 3rd in single season points-per-game


NLL

See also
NCAA Men's Division I Lacrosse Records
UMBC Retrievers men's lacrosse
Dan Marohl

External links
UMBC Retrievers Hof Site
Marohl has proved his points at UMBC
Boys Lacrosse Coach of the Year: Paul Noone, South River
Former Record-Holder Steve Marohl Says Thompsons Will Inspire a Generation
Steve Marohl Managing Principal G & M Investment

American lacrosse players
UMBC Retrievers men's lacrosse players
National Lacrosse League players
Living people
Year of birth missing (living people)